The Greek Orthodox Direct Archdiocesan District of the Greek Orthodox Archdiocese of America is the direct area overseen by the Archbishop of America with 67 parishes.

References

Dioceses of the Greek Orthodox Archdiocese of America